Giran is an Egyptian 2009 documentary film.

Synopsis 
Built at the dawn of the 20th century, the neighborhood of Garden City was a small residential area bordering on downtown Cairo, Egypt, where international political leaders had their residences. Giran walks us through this neighborhood as it is nowadays. Abandoned mansions, luxurious salons, embassies, shops or rooftops, where a whole family lives. The houses and their occupants, witnesses of the changes in History, tell tales of break-ups, hopes and survival.

External links
 
 

2009 films
Egyptian documentary films
2009 documentary films
Documentary films about African politics
Films directed by Tahani Rached